Maung Mu Paing Shin is a 1964 Burmese black-and-white drama film, directed by Aung Win starring Htun Wai, Kawleikgyin Ne Win, Daisy Kyaw Win and Khin Than Nu. In 2000, It was remade with the same name with color.

Cast
Htun Wai as Soe Min
Kawleikgyin Ne Win as Myint Naung
Daisy Kyaw Win as Thin Thin Naing
Khin Than Nu as Nu Nu Swe
Than Nwet as Than Nwet

References

1964 films
1960s Burmese-language films
Burmese black-and-white films
Films shot in Myanmar
1964 drama films
Burmese drama films